Per Gunnar Jonson (11 April 1910 – 16 October 1975) was a Norwegian cinematographer and ski jumper.

Cinematography
Jonson shot a short film about skiing in Karpathos, which impressed German director Leni Riefenstahl, and she hired him as an assistant director for the 1936 Winter Olympics in Garmisch-Partenkirchen. He primarily worked as a cinematographer on Norwegian films, in addition to occasionally working as a director and producer. At the end of his career he established his own film production company.

Ski jumping
In 1934, Per Jonson participated in an international competition at the Bloudek Giant in Planica, making a jump  meters long.

His was one of the best ski jumpers of his time, competing together with legends such as Birger Ruud and his brother Sigmund Ruud. In 1933, he coached the Polish national ski jumping team in Zakopane.

Filmography

 1939: De vergeløse
 1939: Valfångare
 1939: Gjest Baardsen
 1940: Vildmarkens sång
 1940: Mannen som alla ville mörda
 1940: Tante Pose
 1941: Kjærlighet og vennskap
 1941: Gullfjellet
 1946: Englandsfarere
 1947: Sankt Hans fest
 1947: 5 år – som vi så dem
 1948: Trollfossen
 1949: Svendsen går videre
 1950: Marianne på sykehus, short film
 1950: Oslo 24 timer av byens liv
 1951: Flukten fra Dakar
 1951: Skadeskutt
 1951: Kranes konditori
 1952: Trine!
 1952: Nødlanding
 1953: Selkvinnen
 1954: Heksenetter
 1954: Selkvinnen
 1954: Shetlandsgjengen
 1954: Savnet siden mandag
 1955: Hjem går vi ikke
 1956: Kvinnens plass
 1956: Roser til Monica
 1957: Peter van Heeren
 1957: Smuglere i smoking
 1958: Selv om de er små
 1958: I slik en natt
 1958: På slaget åtte
 1959: Hete septemberdager, producer
 1959: Ugler i mosen, producer
 1961: Vår i Skandinavia, short advertising film
 1964: Marenco
 1968: Planica, juče, danas, sutra ..., short film from Yugoslavia

References

External links
 Per G. Jonson at Planica records (planiški rekordi)
 
 Per Jonson at snl.no

Norwegian male ski jumpers
Norwegian film producers
Norwegian cinematographers
Norwegian military personnel of World War II
1910 births
1975 deaths
20th-century Norwegian people